Journal of Chromatography may refer to
Journal of Chromatography A
Journal of Chromatography B